Hazelwood or Hazlewood may refer to:

Places

Australia
Hazelwood, Victoria, an area in the Latrobe Valley, Victoria; now known as Churchill
Hazelwood Power Station, Victoria, in the Latrobe Valley, Victoria
Hazelwood North, Victoria, a town in the Latrobe Valley, Victoria
Hazelwood, Victoria, also known as Hazelwood Pondage, an artificial lake in the Latrobe Valley, Victoria
Hazelwood Park, South Australia, a suburb of Adelaide
Hazelwood Park, Adelaide

Canada
 Rural Municipality of Hazelwood No. 94, Saskatchewan, a rural municipality

England
Hazelwood, Derbyshire (also spelt Hazlewood)
Hazelwood, Devon, the location of the Blackdown Rings earthworks
Hazelwood, London, in the London Borough of Bromley
Hazlewood, North Yorkshire
Hazlewood Castle, North Yorkshire
Hazlewood with Storiths, North Yorkshire

Ireland
Hazelwood, County Sligo
Hazelwood House, Sligo, an 18th century mansion

South Africa
Hazelwood, Pretoria, a suburb of Pretoria, Gauteng Province

United States
Hazelwood, Indiana
Hazelwood, Louisville, Kentucky
Hazelwood Plantation, Laurel Hill, listed on the NRHP in Louisiana
Hazelwood (Upper Marlboro, Maryland), listed on the NRHP in Maryland
Hazelwood, Missouri
Hazelwood School District
Hazelwood, North Carolina
Hazelwood (Pittsburgh), Pennsylvania
Hazelwood, Portland, Oregon
Hazelwood (Port Royal, Virginia), listed on the NRHP in Virginia
Hazelwood (Green Bay, Wisconsin), listed on the NRHP in Wisconsin

People with the surname
Ali Hazelwood, Italian neuroscientist and writer
Charles Hazlewood (born 1966), British conductor
Elizabeth Haselwood (c. 1644–1715) English silversmith
John Hasilwood (died 1544), English politician
John A. Hazelwood (1869–1923), American politician
Joseph Hazelwood (born 1946), the captain of the Exxon Valdez during its 1989 oil spill
Josh Hazlewood (born 1991), Australian cricketer
Lee Hazlewood (1929–2007), American singer
Mike Hazlewood (1941–2001), English singer, songwriter, composer
Mike Hazelwood (born 1958), English water skier
Patsy Hazlewood (born 1949), American politician
Rex Hazlewood (born 1903), British Scouting Official
Rex Hazlewood, Australian architect
, Australian photographer
Roy Hazelwood (1938–2016), FBI profiler
Will Hazlewood (born 1971), British Anglican bishop

Other uses
 Hazelwood (rugby ground), a sports venue in Sunbury-on-Thames, England
 Hazelwood v. Kuhlmeier, a U.S. Supreme Court case
 Hazelwood v. United States, a U.S. Supreme Court case
 Hazelwood School,  Limpsfield, Surrey, England
 Hazelwood School, Birmingham, England
 USS Hazelwood (DD-531)
 USS Hazelwood (DD-107)
 Hazel wood, from the hazel tree
 "The Hazelwood", a song by Patrick Wolf; see Tristan (song)
 Hazlewoods Limited, British bicycle manufacturer

See also